WMTE (1340 AM) was a radio station broadcasting a news/talk format. Licensed to Manistee, Michigan, it first began broadcasting on June 7, 1951 from facilities located on "Radio Hill" on the southern city limits of Manistee near the intersection of 10th and Olga Streets. The station surrendered its license on August 15, 2017.

Profile
The original radio station was housed in a World War II surplus prefab building erected at the transmitter site. Transmitter power was 250 watts with a single transmission tower, typical of Class IV radio stations of that time. In 1962, WMTE increased power to 1000 watts daytime and 250 watts at night. Later Federal Communications Commission (FCC) rule changes raised the nighttime power limit to 1000 watts for most Class IV (later Class C) stations.

WMTE last operated out of downtown studios on Greenbush St. in Manistee, Michigan. The station continued to use the original transmitter location and tower on "Radio Hill" until it went silent on October 1, 2010.

WMTE announced that it had been sold to Ft. Bend Broadcasting on September 24, 2010.  The press release said that it would be signing off permanently on September 30, 2010.  The station officially went silent just after midnight on Friday, October 1, 2010.

Roy S. Henderson & Lake Michigan Broadcasting acquired the then silent WMTE in November 2010. WMTE, along with sister station WCUZ 100.1 FM is currently airing a talk format branded as "Talk Radio 1340 WMTE".

WMTE surrendered its license to the FCC on August 15, 2017; it was cancelled on August 21.

References

External links
 "The spirit of radio" by Sean Bradley, March 31, 2016 (manisteenews.com)
"Radio Days! WMTE AM 1340, Manistee, MI" (radio.barkis.net)
FCC Station Search Details: DWMTE (Facility ID: 10812)
FCC History Cards for WMTE (covering 1946-1981 as WDLG / WMTE)

MTE (AM)
Radio stations established in 1951
1951 establishments in Michigan
Radio stations disestablished in 2017
2017 disestablishments in Michigan
Defunct radio stations in the United States
MTE